The ATypI or Association Typographique Internationale (the International Typography Association) is an international non-profit organisation dedicated to typography and type design. The primary activity of the association is an annual conference, held in a different global city each year.

History
ATypI was founded in 1957 by Charles Peignot (from the French type foundry Deberny & Peignot). The members of the organisation come from the typographic community from all over the world and consist primarily of type designers, representatives of type foundries, graphic designers and typographers.

The organisation is run by a board elected by ATypI members. Each board member is elected by the ATypI general assembly at the annual general meeting for a period of three years. The current president, elected in 2022, is Crystian Cruz. Executive director since 2015 has been Tamye Riggs. Previous presidents have been Charles Peignot, John Dreyfus, Tage Bolander, Martin Fehle, Ernst-Erich Marhencke, Mark Batty, Jean François Porchez, Gerry Leonidas, Jose Scaglione, John D. Berry, Carolina Laudon.

Purposes

The objective and purpose of ATypI is to provide an integrated forum and conferences for all those involved in the field of fonts and typography through their profession and/or their interests, including without limitation:

 type designers and typographers;
 educators in graphic design, educational institutions;
 developers of typographic software and typesetting equipment of all sorts;
 printers and advertising agencies;
 professional organizations, associations; and
 all people, companies, associations, groups, or clubs interested in typography

ATypI also:
 preserves the culture, tradition and history of type and typography
 promotes contemporary digital fonts
 encourages outstanding typography and typographic design
 promotes a critical understanding of typographic issues

Conference
The ATypI conference is held internationally, each year at a different city, usually in September or October. It is organised with the help of local members and institutions, often universities or colleges. In 2020, 2021 and 2022, due to the COVID-19 pandemic, ATypI conferences were held virtually.

Working Seminars

As well as the main conference, ATypI Working Seminars have taken place in Basel (1974), Reading (1976), The Hague (1978), Mainz (1981), Stanford (1983), Hamburg (1985), Gdansk (1988), Budapest (1992), Colombo (2019), Puebla (2019) and Amiens (2020).

Prix Charles Peignot
Every three to six years the ATypI awards the Prix Charles Peignot for Excellence in Type Design to a designer under the age of 35, who has made an outstanding contribution to type design. The recipient is chosen by a committee of ATypI members appointed by the Board. Past winners are: Claude Mediavilla (1982), Jovica Veljović (1985), Petr van Blokland (1988), Robert Slimbach (1991), Carol Twombly (1994), Jean François Porchez (1998), Jonathan Hoefler (2002), Christian Schwartz (2007), Alexandra Korolkova (2013), David Jonathan Ross (2018).

References

External links
 Website of the ATypI
 Historical Website of the ATypI
 Prix Charles Peignot on the ATypI website

Typography
International organizations based in the United States
International conferences
Non-profit organizations based in the United States
West Yorkshire
Non-profit organizations based in New Jersey
1957 establishments in New Jersey